Großdeutschland is German for "Greater Germany" or "Big Germany."  It can refer to:

 Kleindeutschland (Lesser Germany) and Großdeutschland (Greater Germany), two competing ideas for unifying German-speaking lands in the 19th century; advocates of Großdeutschland wished for a single German state that included Austria as the answer to the "German Question."
Großdeutschland, the name informally adopted by Nazi Germany after annexing Austria in March 1938.
 Großdeutsches Reich, Nazi Germany's official state name from 1943 to 1945.
 Infantry Regiment Großdeutschland, a German Army formation in World War II
 Panzer-Grenadier-Division Großdeutschland, a mechanized infantry / armor division created from the Infantry Regiment in 1942.
 Panzerkorps Großdeutschland, a panzer corps created with elements from the Grenadier Division and others in 1944.
 Magna Germania (Latin: Greater Germania), the Roman term for the region east of the Rhine River.

See also
 Anschluss
 Greater Germanic Reich (Großgermanisches Reich)